
The Just Judges or The Righteous Judges  is the lower left panel of the Ghent Altarpiece, painted by Jan van Eyck or his brother Hubert Van Eyck between 1430 and 1432.  It is believed that the panel shows portraits of several contemporary figures such as Philip the Good, and possibly the artists Hubert and Jan van Eyck themselves. The panel was stolen in 1934.

Theft
The panel was displayed at the Saint Bavo Cathedral in Ghent, Belgium together with the rest of the Ghent Altarpiece, until it was stolen during the night of 10 April 1934, by two priest brothers who were discovered by the Belgian Arsène Goedertier (Lede, 23 December 1876 – Dendermonde, 25 November 1934). 
The day after the theft the commissioner of the Ghent police, Antoine Luysterborghs, was briefly present at the crime scene before leaving to investigate a theft at a nearby cheese shop.

The panel was removed together with the second back panel from the frame, apparently with care, leaving the other panels undamaged. On 30 April, the Bishop of Ghent received a ransom demand for one million Belgian francs, to which the Belgian minister refused to agree. A second letter was delivered in May. The Belgian government then commenced negotiations with the thief arguing that since the lost panel was a national treasure, the diocese's ownership interest was subordinate to that of the nation. Correspondence continued through October between the thief and the government, with the exchange of at least 11 letters. In an act of good faith the ransomer returned one of the panel's two parts (a grisaille painting of St John the Baptist).

On 25 November 1934 the self-proclaimed thief, Arsène Goedertier, revealed on his deathbed to his lawyer that he was the only one who knew where the masterpiece was hidden. Goedertier told his lawyer, Georges de Vos, that "I alone know where the Mystic Lamb is. The information is in the drawer on the right of my writing table, in an envelope marked 'mutualité.'" De Vos found carbon copies of the ransom notes, and an unsent note that said "[it] rests in a place where neither I, nor anybody else, can take it away without arousing the attention of the public." De Vos only told the police of Goedertier's confession a month later. The police concluded that Goedertier had been the thief.

It was with inside help from two of the four custodians of the cathedral.  Several people have claimed to know its whereabouts and extensive searches have been held to locate it including an x-ray of the whole cathedral to a depth of 10 metres. In the second World War Henry Koehn of the Kunstschutz reopens the case to find the missing peace and finds out that the investigation was more than pover done. Within 2 years 1940-1942 he requestion all involved properly and writes in his documentation, "Die Kirche hat es", he will leave his office in Brussels in Juli 1944. He will visit Belgium many times till his death in 1963. To this day, a Ghent police detective remains assigned to the case of the missing panel.

Replacement copy
The panel was replaced in 1945 by a copy made by Belgian copyist Jef Van der Veken.  Van der Veken used a two centuries old closet shelf as the painting panel.  He made the copy of the missing painting on the basis of a copy that Michiel Coxie (1499-1592) had produced in the mid-sixteenth century for Philip II of Spain and was kept at the Royal Museums of Fine Arts of Belgium.  In order to harmonize his copy with the appearance of the other panels of the Ghent Altarpiece, Van der Veken applied a layer of wax to create a similar patina. Van der Veken subtly indicated that his work was a copy by giving one of the horsemen the facial features of the then Belgian king Leopold III.

The painting in popular culture
The panel plays a prominent symbolic role in the novel The Fall (1956) by Albert Camus.  Its protagonist, Jean-Baptiste Clamence, claims to have found the painting in a bar called "Mexico City", and his secret withholding of the painting empowers him, he feels, in his newfound role of "judge-penitent".

The panel can be seen in the television series Arrow (season 3, episode 16), in Ra's al Ghul's lair at the dinner table.

The panel is the centerpiece of the novel "The Omega Factor" by Steve Berry, published July 2022.

See also
 List of famous stolen paintings
 August de Schryver

References

Sources
Charney, Noah. Stealing the Mystic Lamb. New York: PublicAffairs. 2010.

External links

The copy of The Just Judges on BALaT - Belgian Art Links and Tools (KIK-IRPA)
The theft of The Just Judges

Lost paintings
Stolen works of art
1430s paintings
Horses in art